The World record progression 100 metres is split by gender:

Men's 100 metres world record progression
Women's 100 metres world record progression